The Russia women's national 3x3 team is a national basketball team of Russia, administered by the Russian Basketball Federation.

It represents the country in international 3x3 (3 against 3) women's basketball competitions.

Senior Competitions

Summer Olympics

Performance at World Championships

Performance at Europe Championships

See also
Russia women's national basketball team

References

Russia women's national basketball team
Women's national 3x3 basketball teams